Sargamysh (Harğamış) is a rural locality (a village) in Meshchegarovsky Selsoviet, Salavatsky District, Bashkortostan, Russia. The population was 256 as of 2010. There are 7 streets.

Geography 
Sargamysh is located 38 km north of Maloyaz (the district's administrative centre) by road. Meshchegarovo is the nearest rural locality.

References 

Rural localities in Salavatsky District